Al-e Yusefi or Al-e Yusofi may refer to:
 Al-e Yusefi-ye Olya